Gilles Maheu (born 1948 in Montreal, Quebec) is a Canadian actor, playwright and director from Quebec. He is most noted for his starring role in the film Night Zoo (Un  Zoo la nuit), for which he was a Genie Award nominee for Best Actor at the 9th Genie Awards in 1988, and as the founder and artistic director of the influential Montreal theatre and dance company Carbone 14.

In 1992, he was one of the recipients of the inaugural Governor General's Performing Arts Awards for his work with Carbone 14. In 1998, he directed the premiere productions of the musical Notre-Dame de Paris.

References

1948 births
20th-century Canadian dramatists and playwrights
20th-century Canadian male actors
21st-century Canadian dramatists and playwrights
21st-century Canadian male actors
Canadian male stage actors
Canadian male film actors
Canadian theatre directors
Canadian male dramatists and playwrights
Writers from Montreal
Male actors from Montreal
Canadian dramatists and playwrights in French
French Quebecers
Living people
Governor General's Performing Arts Award winners
20th-century Canadian male writers
21st-century Canadian male writers